Kerry James O'Keeffe (born 25 November 1949) is a former Australian cricketer and a current cricket commentator for Fox Sports. O'Keeffe played 24 Test matches and two One Day Internationals between 1971 and 1977.

Playing career
He was a spin bowler, bowling leg breaks. He never quite lived up to early expectations of being the next great Australian leg spin bowler, taking 53 wickets at an average of 38.07. He made his Test debut against England in the Fifth Test of the 1970–71 Ashes series after taking 6/69 and hitting 55 not out in the New South Wales match against the tourists, but did little and was dropped. Recalled for the vital Seventh Test on the spinning SCG pitch he took 3/48 and 3/96, but it was not enough to win the game and save The Ashes. He did, however, have some success with the bat, averaging 25.76 and being called upon to open the batting in the second innings of the Centenary Test. One statistic that O'Keeffe himself uses to demonstrate his lack of penetration with the ball is that he is the bowler with the highest percentage of wickets out 'caught' in the history of Test match cricket (44 out of 53 wickets, 84%). This is typical of his commentating style of making fun of his bowling abilities. He often talks of an incident during the 1972 Australian tour of England, when he appealed against a batsman for leg before wicket, and the umpire turned him down, saying that the ball was "doing too much", meaning that the ball was spinning so much that it would have turned away from the stumps. O'Keeffe said that the umpire's comment was a sarcastic jibe at his inability to spin the ball, something he likes to mock himself about.

Post-playing career
O'Keeffe had varied careers post-cricket including as a commentator on ABC Radio. He was known for his humorous anecdotes, told in the manner of an after-dinner speech at a cricketers club, and his distinctive laugh. He especially seemed to enjoy working with overseas commentators such as India's Harsha Bhogle, whom he enjoyed confusing with his colorful Australian language. However, when he concentrated on the game, he showed insight born of a career at the highest level together with study of the statistics and history of the game.

In 2004, he released his autobiography According to Skull. He has also released a number of CDs containing some shorts of his commentating antics.

On 27 December 2013, while providing commentary on the Melbourne Boxing Day Test between Australia and England, O'Keeffe announced his retirement from commentating after the Sydney Test in January 2014 (O'Keeffe had accepted a redundancy from the ABC).
However, O'Keeffe returned to cricket commentary in December 2016 as part of Triple M's new cricket coverage.

On 13 July 2018, it was announced that O'Keeffe had joined the Fox Sports cricket commentary team from the 2018–19 season. O'Keeffe's commentary during the Indian tour of Australia in 2018 received backlash from the Indian team management and on social media for being derogatory towards Indian players. A day before the fourth Test, it was reported that Indian broadcaster Sony had decided to black out O'Keeffe's commentary by not using Fox Cricket's commentary feed when he is on air.

References

External links

Kerry O'Keeffe's Biography on ICMI Sport Speakers 
Kerry O'Keeffe tells joke during Aus v Sri Lanka Final ODI at Gabba 2006

1949 births
Living people
Australia One Day International cricketers
Australia Test cricketers
Australian cricket commentators
New South Wales cricketers
Somerset cricketers
World Series Cricket players
Australian cricketers
Cricketers from Sydney
D. H. Robins' XI cricketers